I Am Harlequin or IAH is the recording and production alias of London-based singer/songwriter and producer Anne Freier.

Anne was born in Dresden, Germany. She mentions that her father, who grew up during East Germany's GDR regime, had a big impact on her musical influences, introducing her to the likes of Michael Jackson, Whitney Houston, Chaka Khan, Cyndi Lauper, Yes, Billy Joel, Kate Bush, Grace Slick, Ricky Lee Jones, Tori Amos, and Joni Mitchell, but also classical music such as Prokofiev, Rachmaninoff and later Sondheim.

Anne wrote her first song at the age of seven with the help of a bear-inspired English book for children. She then performed regularly with her sister in front of family and friends and soon moved to London. She is a trained singer. Whilst at university studying music she focused on production and technology, recording herself performing on the piano with a laptop and an Mbox on Pro Tools. In addition to music, IAH designs and sews most of her stage wear. She edits and directs her own music videos  and writes fiction in her spare time.

IAH previously performed at Liverpool Sound City, Brighton Festival, Boardmasters Festival and LastFm Presents at the Garage and earned the seventeenth spot in the top 20 of the LastFm Discovery Charts.

Her single "Wild One" featured on award-winning drama Skins Season 6, Episode 9 as well as The Client List. In the same year, I Am Harlequin performed in a live session on BBC 4's acclaimed Loose Ends, alongside the Civil Wars.

In Feb 2014, she wrote and featured on producer duo Hermanos Inglesos' single "The Fastlane", released through Sony Music.

IAH also remixes music and has previously remixed Queen's "Don't Stop Me Now" for which she received public praise, turning the song into a symphonic choir piece.

The Independent previously praised IAH as “One To Watch […] she’s the beautifully cool pop star we’ve been waiting for”  Joining a Wonderland live session, the magazine said: "Anne’s all about the performance, not the polish, not that her voice needs it, but her offhand style only adds to her effortlessly cool aura in her Wonderland Session." Vulture Hound called her latest single "Dance With Anyone" "the kind of groove you want immersed within your ‘Sound of Summer’ playlist"

Discography

References
 

Year of birth missing (living people)
Living people
British women singers